David Lowery may refer to:

 David Lowery (director) (born 1980), American filmmaker
 David Lowery (footballer) (born 1984), English footballer
 David Lowery (musician) (born 1960), American musician

See also 
 David Lowry, British research consultant for nuclear and environment policy